The Oregon International Port of Coos Bay is a port of the Pacific coast of the United States, located in Coos Bay near the city of Coos Bay, Oregon. It is the largest deep-draft coastal harbor between San Francisco Bay and Puget Sound, and is Oregon's second busiest maritime commerce center after the Port of Portland. The port operates the 134-mile Coos Bay Rail Link which connects the port to Eugene, Oregon and the national rail network.

In the mid-1900s, the Port of Coos Bay held the title of "world's largest lumber shipping port". Lumber ships loaded with whole-log loads of the region's prized Douglas fir, Western hemlock, and Port Orford cedar timber were a common sight at the docks.

See also 

 Jordan Cove Energy Project

References

External links
Official website
NOAA profile

Oregon Coast
Coos Bay, Port of
Transportation in Coos County, Oregon